The Embassy of Namibia in Washington, D.C. is the Republic of Namibia's diplomatic mission to the United States. It's located at 1605 New Hampshire Avenue, Northwest, Washington, D.C., in the Dupont Circle neighborhood. 

The current ambassador is Margaret Mensah-Williams.

References

External links
Official website
wikimapia

Namibia
Washington, D.C.
Namibia–United States relations
Dupont Circle